Benjamin Augustine Enloe (January 18, 1848 – July 8, 1922) was an American politician and a member of the United States House of Representatives for the 8th congressional district of Tennessee.

Biography
Enloe was born on January 18, 1848, in Clarksburg, Tennessee son of Benjamin S. and Nancy O. Blair Enloe. He attended Bethel College (McKenzie, Tennessee) and Cumberland University in (Lebanon, Tennessee). He married Fannie Howard Ashworth on April 5, 1870, and they had two children, Benjamin Augustine and Marie.

Career
While a student at Cumberland University, Enloe was elected a member of the Tennessee House of Representatives in 1869. He was re-elected under the new state constitution in 1870. He graduated from the Cumberland Law School in 1872, was admitted to the bar in 1873, and began practice in Jackson, Tennessee. He was a delegate to the Democratic National Convention in 1872 and in 1880. He was appointed by Governor Albert S. Marks in 1878 to negotiate the settling of the state deficit. He served on the state executive committee from 1878 to 1880. He edited the Jackson Tribune and the Daily Sun from 1874 to 1886.

Enloe was elected as a Democrat to the Fiftieth and the three following Congresses. During the Fifty-second and Fifty-third Congresses, he was chairman of the United States House Committee on Education. Not successful as a candidate for re-election in 1894 to the Fifty-fourth Congress. He served from March 4, 1887, to March 4, 1895.

After editing the Daily Sun at Nashville, Tennessee, for two years, Enloe moved to Louisville, Kentucky, and edited the Louisville Dispatch for two years. He was secretary of the state fair commission and director of exhibits from Tennessee at the St. Louis World's Fair in 1903. Elected railroad commissioner of Tennessee, Enloe served from 1904 until his death.

Death
Enloe died at his home in Nashville on July 8, 1922, aged 74. He is interred at Mount Olivet Cemetery.

References

External links

1848 births
1922 deaths
Cumberland University alumni
Democratic Party members of the Tennessee House of Representatives
People from Nashville, Tennessee
Bethel University (Tennessee) alumni
Democratic Party members of the United States House of Representatives from Tennessee
People from Carroll County, Tennessee